is a Japanese manga version of Murasaki Shikibu's The Tale of Genji by Waki Yamato.

It follows nearly the same plot with some modern adaptation. It was originally published from 1979 to 1993 in the manga magazine Mimi, which Yamato had worked for already in the years before. It spanned thirteen volumes and was published by Kodansha. The series was partially translated into English (as The Tale of Genji) by Stuart Atkin and Yoko Toyosaki as a part of Kodansha's attempts to publish bilingual manga as a study guide for Japanese students. The Tale of Genji sold 20 million copies. The first ten volumes focus on Hikaru Genji and his life, the final three volumes follow two princes, lord Kaoru and Niou no miya (Royal Prince with Perfumes) after Hikaru Genji's death.

An anime adaptation was scheduled to air in Fuji Television's noitaminA block, starting January 2009, but the producer decided to make the anime directly from the original Tale of Genji, calling the new anime Genji Monogatari Sennenki.

Characters

The First Part
Volumes 1 to 10
 Hikaru Genji - royal prince, 2nd son of Emperor Kiritsubo. Because of his beauty and excellence, people called him the Shining Prince. His father, the Emperor, loved this beautiful prince, and gave him a branch house, called Gen. This meant he was no longer part of the royal family and lost the right to succeed the throne, since his mother was a concubine of low rank. Therefore, he was called Gen-ji, shining Gen-ji (Hikaru Genji).
 Emperor Kiritsubo - father of Genji. He wished Genji to become his successor, but it would be impossible since his mother Kiritsubo-koui's was of low rank and the mother of his 1st son, Kokiden-nyougo, was of high rank.
 Kiritsubo-koui - 2nd class concubine of Emperor Kiritsubo, mother of Genji. The emperor loved her most, but it resulted in death of Kiritsubo-koui under jealousy and hatred of other concubines in the palace.
 Kokiden-nyougo - 1st class concubine, mother of 1st royal prince (later, Emperor Suzaku) of Emperor Kiritsubo. Daughter of the Minister at the right.
 Fujitsubo-nyougo - royal princess and 1st class concubine of Emperor Kiritsubo. Fujitsubo looked a lot like late Kiritsubo-koui. Emperor Kiritsubo loved her and she became the Empress consort (Chuuguu). Lord Genji loved and adored Fujitsubo and he committed adultery with her.
 Murasaki no ue - daughter of the Prince Lord Minister of Ceremony, niece of Empress consort Fujitsubo. Lord Genji first met her when she was 12 years old. Later, Genji married her and she was called Murasaki no ue (high Dame Murasaki).
 Aoi no ue - daughter of the Minister at the left. She was 4 years older than Genji. Aoi was the first spouse of Genji - therefore she was called Aoi no ue (high Dame Aoi). She has been raised to be married to the next emperor, but was instead married to Genji who was the second son of the emperor. This has made Aoi cold and distant from her husband. Aoi was killed by jealous living ghost of royal Dame Rokujou.
 Rokujou-miyasudokoro - mother of princess Umetsubo-nyougo, 1st class concubine of the former Crown Prince who was an elder brother of Emperor Kiritsubo. After her husband's death, she has locked herself up in her mansion and only comes out during a poetry recital. Considered to be very popular at court and carries the reputation of being both wise and beautiful. She became Genji's mistress. Her love overwhelmed the Prince Genji which eventually drove him away from her."Miyasudokoro" is title of mother of royal prince/princess.
 Yuugiri - 2nd son of Genji. His mother was high Dame Aoi.
 Emperor Suzaku - 1st son of Emperor Kiritsubo. His mother was Kokiden-nyougo. Suzaku succeeded his father Kiritsubo's throne and became emperor. Kokiden-nyougo was, then, grand Empress consort.
 Emperor Reizei - son of Empress consort Fujitsubo. He was considered as the royal prince, son of Emperor Kiritsubo, but his real father was Lord Genji. He was a child of adultery.
 Tou-no-chuujou - eldest son of the Minister at the left, elder brother of Aoi. He was a rival and good friend of Genji.
 Yuugao - a young lady from middle class but reputed to be beautiful and young. She was one of Genji's loves. She was killed by living ghost of jealous Rokujou-miyasudokoro at the age of nineteen. Her death left Genji into a pit of depression. She left a girl baby, later called Tamakadura, who was just a daughter of Tou-no-chuujou.
 Hana-chiru-sato - a young lady, sister of the concubine of Emperor Suzaku. One of Genji's loves. Not so beautiful, but warm-hearted lady.
 Oborodukiyo - daughter of the Minister at the right, younger sister of grand Empress consort Kokiden. She was beautiful and brave lady. Kokiden planned to make her 1st class concubine of Emperor Suzaku. But she had love affairs with Lord Genji. Then, she became the chief Lady of Chamber (Naishi-no-kami) of Emperor Suzaku. Kokiden got anger, and Genji retired to the seashore place at Suma.
 Akashi-no-okata - daughter of Priest Akashi. A beautiful, elegant, young lady. Genji and his followers met with disaster by typhoon at Suma. They moved to Akashi according to invitation by Priest Akashi. Genji, then, made love with her and begot a girl baby (later, Akashi-no-nyougo).
 (shin)-Kokiden-nyougo - daughter of Tou-no-chuujou, elder sister of Kumoi-no-Kari. She was a 1st class concubine of Emperor Reizei.
 Umetsubo-nyougo - daughter of Rokujou-miyasudokoro and the former Crown Prince. She was Royal princess and entered into the palace of Emperor Reizei as nyougo (1st class concubine). Royal Dame Rokujou had died. Genji became her father in palace low. Emperor Reizei became aware that Genji was his real father. Reizei fell in agony, and at last accepted the fact. Reizei raised Umetsubo to the Empress consort for she was Genji's daughter in low. Umetsubo became Akikonomu-chuuguu. Genji became de facto Ex-Emperor, Rokujou-in.
 Kumoi-no-Kari - daughter of Tou-no-chuujou. Younger sister of shin-Kokiden-nyougo. She fell in love with Yuugiri, the son of Genji. She married Yuugiri.
 Tamakadura - daughter of Tou-no-chuujou and Yuugao. Beautiful young lady. She left Kyoto for Dazai-fu at Kyushu in her very young age. After having grown up and become a young lady she returned to Kyoto. Genji found her and announced she was her daughter. Many high rank noblemen sent love-letters to her. Royal army General at the left, Kurohige, proposed her and kidnapped her.
 San-no-miya

Relations maps of characters

Characters appeared in the Tale of Genji are many and their relations are highly complicated. The following lists/maps show the rough overview of their relations.

Emperor Kiritsubo and Hikaru Genji
Emperor Kiritsubo has many wives, representatively three ladies are important:
 Kokiden-nyougo, 1st class concubine, mother of Emperor Suzaku, She is later Grand Empress consort
 Kiritsubo-koui, 2nd class concubine, mother of Genji
 Fujitsubo-nyougo, Royal princess, 1st class concubine, mother of Emperor Reizei, She is later Empress consort

Emperor Kiritsubo has at least 10 sons, representatively five princes are important:
 1st son, Emperor Suzaku, child of Kokiden-nyougo
 2nd son, Hikaru Genji, child of Kiritsubo-koui
 ?th son, Sochi-no-miya (Prince Lord Minister of Dazaifu)
 8th son, Hachi-no-miya (Eighth Royal prince)
 9th son (maybe), Emperor Reizei, child of Fujitsubo-nyougo, really, son of Genji

Hikaru Genji has many wives and loves, representatively following ladies are important:
 1st formal spouse, high Dame Aoi (Aoi no ue), mother of Yuugiri, daughter of the Minister at the left
 2nd formal spouse, high Dame Murasaki (Murasaki no ue), no child, informal daughter of Prince Lord Minister of Ceremony
 3rd formal spouse, Royal princess San-no-miya (third Royal princess), mother of Kaoru (real father of Kaoru is but Kashiwagi), daughter of Emperor Suzaku
 spouse, Dame Hana-chiru-sato, no child
 spouse, Dame Akashi (Akashi-no-onkata), mother of Akashi-no-nyougo, daughter of Priest Akashi
 love, Rokujou-miyasudokoro, mother of Umetsubo-nyougo (her father is former Crown Prince)
 love, Lady Oborodukiyo (Chief Lady of Chamber), no child, daughter of the Minister at the right
 love, Lady Suetsumu-hana, no child, daughter of Hitachi-no-miya (Royal Prince Hitachi)
 love, Lady Utsusemi, no child, daughter of middle class nobleman
 love, Lady Yuugao, mother of Tamakadura (her father is Tou-no-chuujou)
 secret love, Empress consort Fujitsubo, mother of Emperor Reizei, daughter of the former Emperor

Hikaru Genji has three children. Officially his children are two.
 1st son, Emperor Reizei, child of Fujitsubo-chuuguu, child of adultery
 2nd son, Yuugiri, child of high Dame Aoi (Aoi no ue),
 1st daughter, Akashi-no-nyougo, child of Dame Akashi (Akashi-no-onkata)
 daughter in law, Umetsubo-nyougo, child of Rokujou-miyasudokoro and former Crown Prince, later Empress consort Akikonomu of Emperor Reizei

Other characters
The house of the Minister at the left (Sa-daijin) and the house of the Minister at the right (U-daijin) are rival. Genji's first formal spouse (high Dame Aoi) is daughter of the Sa-dijin and his love Lady Oborodukiyo is daughter of U-daijin, in addition Oborodukiyo is love of Emperor Suzaku who is son of Kokiden-nyougo.

Sa-daijin (Minister at the left) has at least two children.
 Tou-no-chuujou, rival and friend of Genji
 Aoi (high Dame Aoi), 1st formal spouse of Genji, mother of Yuugiri

U-daijin (Minister at the right) has at least two daughters.
 Kokiden-nyougo, mother of Emperor Suzaku
 Lady Oborodukiyo, love of Genji and Emperor Suzaku

Tou-no-chuujou has at least five children.
 Kashiwagi, father of Kaoru, Kaoru's mother is San-no-miya (Kaoru is child of adultery)
 Koubai-dainagon
 (shin) Kokinden-nyougo, 1st class concubine of Emperor Reizei
 Dame Kumoi-no-Kari, formal spouse of Yuugiri
 Dame Tamakadura, daughter of Yuugao, 2nd formal spouse of Kurohige
 
Emperor Suzaku has at least three children.
 Tou-guu (Crown Prince), later Emperor
 2nd daughter, Ni-no-miya (second Royal princess) alias Ochiba-no-miya
 3rd daughter, San-no-miya (third Royal princess), 3rd formal spouse of Genji

Terms in Heian Peers
Basic terms
 Tei, Mikado (帝): Emperor
 Official spouses of emperor: There are some classes of official spouses.
 Chuuguu (中宮), or Kougou (皇后): Empress consort, formal spouse, highest rank, member of royal family
 Nyougo (女御): 1st class concubine, usually royal princess or daughter of highest rank house
 Koui (更衣): 2nd class concubine, usually daughter of middle rank house
 Naishi-no-kami (尚侍): Chief Lady of Chamber, Emperor's Secretary in chief, sometimes informal 1st class concubine
 Naishi-no-suke (典侍): Deputy Lady of Chamber, Emperor's deputy Secretary
 Shinnou (親王): Royal prince, son of emperor/royal prince, authorized by emperor
 Nai-shinnou (内親王): Royal princess, daughter of emperor/royal prince, authorized by emperor
 Miya (宮): Royal prince/princess, house of emperor/royal family
 Ichi-no-miya (一宮): eldest Royal prince/princess
 Ni-no-miya (二宮): second Royal prince/princess
 San-no-miya (三宮): third Royal prince/princess
 Joukou (上皇): Ex-emperor/Ex-empress
 In (院): title name of Ex-emperor, palace of Ex-emperor
 Kiritsubo-tei (桐壺帝): Emperor Kiritsubo
 Kiritsubo-in (桐壺院): Ex-Emperor Kiritsubo
 Suzaku-tei (朱雀帝): Emperor Suzaku
 Reizei-tei (冷泉帝): Emperor Reizei
 Rokujou-in (六條院): Ex-Emperor Rokujou (de facto Ex-Emperor title of Hikaru Genji)
 Otodo, Daijin (大臣): Minister
 Dajou-daijin (太政大臣): Grand Minister
 Sa-daijin (左大臣): Minister at the left, higher rank than U-daijin
 U-daijin (右大臣): Minister at the right
 Shikibukyou (式部卿): Lord Minister of Ceremony
 Shikibukyou-no-miya (式部卿宮): Prince Lord Minister of Ceremony
 Ue (上): literally "up", "the high", in the case of "/female name/+no+Ue", formal spouse of highest rank person, such as formal spouse of Grand Minister
 Aoi-no-ue (葵の上): formal spouse of Hikaru Genji, Genji later became Grand Minister and Ex-Emperor
 Murasaki-no-ue (紫の上): de facto formal spouse of Hikaru Genji, Murasaki is but not so high rank as that of Aoi. Aoi is a daughter of Grand Minister and Royal princess. Murasaki is an informal daughter of Royal prince and a daughter of middle class peer.

Origin of title
The title "Asaki yume mishi" comes from the Iroha poem.
Iro ha nihoheto chirinuru wo wakayo .... uwi no okuyama kefu koete, Asaki yume mishi wehi mo sesu.

References
 Yamato Waki Asaki Yume Mishi 1 to 10 volumes, Kodansha
 Yamato Waki Asaki Yume Mishi 11 to 13 volumes, Kodansha

manga
Shōjo manga
Manga based on novels